Northstowe is a  new town that will eventually have up to 10,000 homes, with an anticipated population of 24,400 in Cambridgeshire, England, UK. On 1 April 2021 Northstowe became a civil parish, the parish was formed from Longstanton and Oakington and Westwick, with the first town council elected on 6th May of that year. Northstowe has been in development for around 15 years and through varying political administrations. Originally proposed to be "an exemplar of sustainability in the use of renewable energy resources and reducing carbon emissions", Northstowe will still have many exemplar features including a Sustainable Urban Drainage Scheme (SUDS) and bus, bicycle and pedestrian only links. The Northstowe development is being led by Homes England, the successor body to the Homes and Communities Agency, and the developers Gallagher Estates (part of L&Q).

In January 2008, Yvette Cooper, Minister for Housing and Planning Department for Communities and Local Government at the time, confirmed in Parliament that Northstowe had not been adopted as an eco-town because the 2007 planning application submitted "predate[s] the eco-towns programme", and because it would not be zero-carbon.

Northstowe is linked to Cambridge and St Ives by the Cambridgeshire Guided Busway which was opened in 2011.

In 2012 outline consent was given to Gallagher to progress with the first phase of 1500 homes, a primary school, road improvements and a local centre.  The primary school, The Pathfinder Church of England School, opened its gates to pupils in September 2017, initially taking pupils mostly from Longstanton for a year to allow redevelopment of Hatton Park Primary School.

In 2015 outline consent was also agreed in principle to build a further 3,500 homes, a town centre, 3 more schools including a secondary school education campus and a link road to the A14, plus a road linking the town to the Guided Busway.  The homes in phase two could not be occupied until a major A14 upgrade is completed which started in 2016 and was completed in early  2020.

The first new homes at Northstowe were occupied in April 2017.

In May 2020 the outline planning applications for the third and final phase were submitted for 5,000 homes, consisting of 4,000 homes on phase 3a and 1,000 homes on phase 3b.

History

The site covers Oakington Barracks on the former RAF Oakington, a World War II airfield which was used for Short Stirling bomber forces and other assorted units. It was used for flight training until the 1970s.

From 2000 to 2010 the barracks was leased to the Home Office for use as the Oakington Immigration Reception Centre.

In the phase one Local Management Study, published in February 2006 it was suggested that a community-based energy company might be formed, owning assets such as wind turbines or combined heat and power plants for the benefit of the town, perhaps based on the models of the Vauban district of Freiburg, Germany, and the cooperative energy companies of Denmark and Sweden. Car clubs, cycling and walking were also envisaged. In March 2006 the site was acquired by English Partnerships who subsequently became the Homes and Communities Agency and now Homes England.

In March 2007 planning inspectors recommended that Northstowe should consist of 10,000 homes rather than the 8,000 originally planned, and ruled that a country park need not be incorporated. The news was greeted with concern by many in the area who feared further expansion in the future.

In the same month Yvette Cooper, Minister for Housing and Planning Department for Communities and Local Government at the time announced that Northstowe would be designed with energy and water efficiency standards up to 50% above conventional buildings. On 13 May 2007, Gordon Brown went further, announcing that the housing on the development would be built to zero-carbon building standards if he were elected to succeed Tony Blair as leader of the Labour Party. In response, local Liberal Democrat MP for Cambridge, David Howarth, called on the Chancellor to allow local authorities to impose zero-carbon standards on other developments too, and to provide a serious investment in public transport for the new eco-towns.

A planning application for the new town was submitted to South Cambridgeshire District Council on 19 December 2007. Plans included the construction of around 9,500 homes, a town centre area, schools and employment areas.

In January 2008, however, Cooper confirmed in Parliament that Northstowe had not been adopted as an eco-town because the planning application "predate[s] the eco-towns programme", and because it would not be zero-carbon.

In November 2008 it was announced that the scheme would be delayed by at least a year due to the Financial crisis of 2007–2010. In March 2008 the Cambridge Cycling Campaign submitted a formal objection to the Northstowe planning application due to the inadequate cycling and walking provision.

In June 2009 the scheme was not included in the first round of schemes to be given the go-ahead because it did not score highly enough for sustainability; only one scheme, Rackheath eco-town, received an 'A' and was approved. In December 2009 it was announced that the scheme was 'back on the government's eco-town list' because elements had been redesigned to meet even higher sustainability standards.

In February 2012 a Development Framework Document was adopted by the planning authority to progress the town. The plan envisages a maximum of 10,000 new homes created in phases building services and facilities along with homes piece by piece, the first being to the north adjoining the existing Longstanton park-and-ride site owned by Gallagher and the second on the former Government-owned barracks. In October 2012, the first phase of the new town was approved by South Cambridgeshire District Council. with completion of the whole town envisaged after about 25 years.

In December 2014 the government announced that the Government-owned land at Northstowe could be a test location for a new government initiative that directly commissioned homes, overseen by the Homes and Communities Agency.

In the 2015 United Kingdom budget on 18 March 2015, George Osborne confirmed the Government's intent to create a joint venture with a private sector partner to lead development on the Government-owned part of the town location.  This initiative has subsequently not been pursued.

The first building, a primary school, started on site in April 2015 and the first homes occupied in 2017.

In 2015 outline consent was also agreed in principle to build a further 3,500 homes, a town centre, 3 more schools including a secondary school education campus and a link road to the A14, plus a road linking the town to the Guided Busway. Planning permission was granted in January 2017  The homes in phase two could not be occupied until a major A14 upgrade was completed.

In April 2016, Bloor Homes was named as the first housebuilder for the site with 92 new homes planned in a range of types and sizes up to five bedrooms.

Northstowe was announced as an NHS Healthy New Town in March 2016. A Healthy Living Strategy for Northstowe was commended at the Landscape Institute awards 2018.

In the spring of 2018 Homes England invested £55 million to provide a new road linking the town to the upgraded A14 and other essential infrastructure to allow more homes to be built.

In November 2018 the first phase of the secondary school was started and it was completed to welcome children for the academic year 2019-20. Northstowe Secondary College is operated by the Cambridge Meridian Academies Trust.

In the spring of 2019 Homes England built their new regional office at Northstowe, designed and built off site using Modern Methods of Construction to help pioneer new techniques in the construction sector.

In February 2020 a planning application was submitted to build a new heritage centre adjacent to the Homes England offices to showcase the historical artefacts found on site and more importantly during the construction of the nearby upgraded A14.

As of May 2020 approximately 550 homes in Northstowe were occupied, with the Bloor Homes site completed and 5 active housebuilding sites: Bovis Homes with some marketed and sold by Domovo Homes (a subsidy of bpha), Linden Homes, Taylor Wimpey and Barratt Homes as both Barratt and David Wilson Homes brands. Playing fields, allotments, and public spaces were under development.

In 2020 Urban Splash in partnership with the Japanese construction company Sekesui are starting to build the first homes in phase 2 – 406 homes built using innovative modern methods of construction.

In 2020 Homes England submitted a Town Centre Strategy, setting out the principles for a new town centre to be developed for the town.  The Strategy proposes a shift away from a reliance on retail on its high street, and instead focuses on the potential of creative industries, leisure, education, high-quality food and small-scale manufacturing.

Public transport links
Northstowe is connected to the Cambridgeshire Guided Busway at Longstanton Park & Ride, with a further busway loop through the town under construction.

See also

 Code for Sustainable Homes
 Sustainable Communities Plan
 Millennium Communities Programme
 New towns in the United Kingdom
 Energy efficiency in British housing
 Low-energy building
 Ecocities

References

External links
Northstowe official site
Photos of the Northstowe Lake

In the media
26 June 2008, Cambridge Evening News: Students unveil their vision for Northstowe
16 April 2008, The Guardian, Clash over Cambridgeshire green town plans
13 May 2007, BBC: Brown outlines 'eco towns' plan
7 March 2007, Government News Network: New Eco-Towns could help tackle climate change
14 July 2005, BBC: Plan for new town moves forward

Low-energy building in the United Kingdom
Architecture in England
Ecovillages
Populated places in Cambridgeshire
New towns in England
New towns started in the 2010s
Civil parishes in Cambridgeshire
South Cambridgeshire District